Rosangela Settanni, a.k.a. Rose Settanni, is a Luxembourgian football midfielder currently serving as a player-coach for Jeunesse Junglinster in Luxembourg's 1st League. She is a former member of Luxembourgian national team, who served as its captain.

References

1982 births
Living people
Luxembourg women's international footballers
Women's association football midfielders
Luxembourgian women's footballers